was a town located in Shida District, Shizuoka Prefecture, Japan.

As of 2008, the town had an estimated population of 22,695 and a density of 962.92 persons per km². The total area was 24.54 km².

On November 1, 2008, Ōigawa was merged into the expanded city of Yaizu and thus no longer exists as an independent municipality.

Geography

Surrounding municipalities
Fujieda
Yaizu
Shimada
Yoshida, Haibara District

History
April 1, 1889 – Aikawa Village, Yoshinaga Village and Shizuhama Village founded.
March 31, 1955 – Ōigawa Town was created from the merger of Aikawa, Yoshinaga and Shizuhama.
November 1, 2008 – Ōigawa Town was merged into the expanded city of Yaizu.

References

External links
 Yaizu official website 

Dissolved municipalities of Shizuoka Prefecture
Populated places established in 1889
Populated places disestablished in 2008
2008 disestablishments in Japan
Yaizu, Shizuoka